In graph theory, the Kneser graph  (alternatively ) is the graph whose vertices correspond to the -element subsets of a set of  elements, and where two vertices are adjacent if and only if the two corresponding sets are disjoint. Kneser graphs are named after Martin Kneser, who first investigated them in 1956.

Examples 

The Kneser graph  is the complete graph on  vertices.

The Kneser graph  is the complement of the line graph of the complete graph on  vertices.

The Kneser graph  is the odd graph ; in particular  is the Petersen graph (see top right figure).

The Kneser graph , visualized on the right.

Properties

Basic properties 
The Kneser graph  has  vertices. Each vertex has exactly  neighbors.

The Kneser graph is vertex transitive and arc transitive. When , the Kneser graph is a strongly regular graph, with parameters . However, it is not strongly regular when , as different pairs of nonadjacent vertices have different numbers of common neighbors depending on the size of the intersection of the corresponding pairs of sets.

Chromatic number 
This conjecture was proved in several ways.

László Lovász proved this in 1978 using topological methods, giving rise to the field of topological combinatorics.
Soon thereafter Imre Bárány gave a simple proof, using the Borsuk–Ulam theorem and a lemma of David Gale.
Joshua E. Greene won the 2002 the Morgan Prize for outstanding undergraduate research for his further simplified but still topological proof.
In 2004, Jiří Matoušek found a purely combinatorial proof.
When ,  has no edges and its chromatic number is 1.

Hamiltonian cycle 
The Kneser graph  contains a Hamiltonian cycle if
 Since

holds for all  this condition is satisfied if

The Kneser graph  contains a Hamiltonian cycle if there exists a non-negative integer a such that . In particular, the odd graph  has a Hamiltonian cycle if .

Cliques 
When , the Kneser graph  contains no triangles. More generally, when  it does not contain cliques of size , whereas it does contain such cliques when . Moreover, although the Kneser graph always contains cycles of length four whenever , for values of  close to  the shortest odd cycle may have variable length.

Diameter 
The diameter of a connected Kneser graph  is

Spectrum
The spectrum of the Kneser graph  consists of k + 1 distinct eigenvalues: 

Independence number 

Related graphs 
The Johnson graph  is the graph whose vertices are the -element subsets of an -element set, two vertices being adjacent when they meet in a -element set. The Johnson graph  is the complement of the Kneser graph . Johnson graphs are closely related to the Johnson scheme, both of which are named after Selmer M. Johnson.

Thus .

Two vertices are connected by an edge whenever one set is a subset of the other. The bipartite Kneser graph  is the Desargues graph and the bipartite Kneser graph  is a crown graph.

References

Notes

Works cited

External links 
 
 

Parametric families of graphs
Regular graphs